Day for night is a set of cinematic techniques used to simulate a night scene while filming in daylight. It is often employed when it is too difficult or expensive to actually shoot during nighttime. Because both film stocks and digital image sensors lack the sensitivity of the human eye in low light conditions, night scenes recorded in natural light, with or without moonlight, may be underexposed to the point where little or nothing is visible. This problem can be avoided by using daylight to substitute for darkness. When shooting day for night, the scene is typically underexposed in-camera or darkened during post-production, with a blue tint added. Additional effects are often used to heighten the impression of night.

As film stocks and video cameras have improved in light sensitivity, shooting day for night has become less common in recent years.

Techniques
During the silent era of film, release prints were often tinted blue during night scenes to enhance the illusion. Although moonlight is not actually blue, it appears bluish to the human eye due to the Purkinje effect. To give a bluer appearance to scenes filmed in color, some techniques use 3200K tungsten-balanced rather than 5000K daylight-balanced film stock. The tungsten balance renders artificial lighting (street lights, headlights, lit windows, etc.) as white and unlit areas as "moonlight blue." With professional video cameras, color temperature adjustments are made to achieve the same effect. With digital post production now nearly universal, the color temperature adjustment is usually made in camera, to preserve the "white" artificial lights, but scene darkening is left to post production for finer control of the effect.

Underexposing the shot can add to the illusion of darkness or moonlight. It is typical to underexpose by about two f-stops. A neutral-density filter is often used to achieve this darkening, so that the camera aperture remains unchanged.

Daytime sky can be darkened to simulate night. With black and white film, a red lens filter will turn a blue sky black. Infrared film is occasionally used for long shots, but it renders green foliage as white. Yellow or orange filters (Wratten 8 or 15) can be substituted for closer shots, to preserve the performers' flesh tones. With color film or video, a graduated neutral-density filter can achieve a similar effect, as can a polarizing filter. Using either of these filters can limit camera movement during a shot, as the axis of a graduated filter must match the horizon, and the effect of the polarizing filter changes as the axis of the camera lens moves relative to the sun. If the scene is backlit by the sun for a "moonlight" rim light effect, faces and other foreground details may be too dark to see properly. Partially filling shadows with reflectors or a 5000K (daylight-balanced) key light can compensate for this. Even so, shadow areas are still slightly under-lit, to match the higher contrast of the overall scene.

With digital post-production techniques it is also common to add or intensify glare and light scattering from light sources that would otherwise be less pronounced in daylight, such as windows revealing indoor lighting, outdoor artificial lights, car headlights, and so on. Day for night techniques can be made more convincing through such digital effects. It is possible to digitally replace the entire sky to add the moon and stars, as was done for the film Cast Away. For the 2015 film Mad Max: Fury Road, an unusual variation of the technique was used, in which scenes were deliberately overexposed, rather than underexposed as is typically recommended. Taking advantage of the dynamic range of the digital cameras used on the production, the shots were then darkened and color-graded a bluish tint in post-production, with the result that detail was maintained in the shadows rather than being clipped, as might happen when underexposing.

Instead of shooting during midday, it is also common to shoot at dawn or dusk. During these periods, car headlights, streetlights, and interior lights are on, as they would be at night. This is sometimes referred to as "dusk for night." Shooting this way can be difficult because the desired lighting conditions last only a short time, during which both light levels and color temperatures are constantly changing.

In other media
A similar technique can sometimes be observed in older hand-tinted postcard views, where a "night" view of a scene is created by simply re-tinting the original (black and white) photo with darker coloration, suggestive of night.

Though the results resemble day for night film and video shots, the techniques are quite different. Instead of reducing the exposure of the print made for the night version, the colorist painted an identical print with darker individual tints. No attempt at an overall bluish effect was made, and many colors are actually warmer in the "night" scene. (Compare the two beach umbrellas.) Convincing bright hot spots were added to the streetlights, which are unlit in the original, and the sky was supplied with fewer, wispier clouds.

Night for day
A related technique is night for day, where an interior location is shot at night but lit to simulate daylight, often by projecting large lights through windows.

References

Citations

Sources

External links
 
 

Cinematic techniques